Mihovil Pavlinović (28 January 1831 – 18 May 1887) was a Croatian Roman Catholic priest, politician, and writer who led Croatian National Revival in the Kingdom of Dalmatia. He is known as a keen promoter of Croatian political thought in Dalmatia, one of the founders of the liberal People's Party and consistent advocate of unification of Kingdom of Dalmatia and Kingdom of Croatia-Slavonia.

Early life and education
Mihovil Pavlinović was born in a small village of Podgora near Makarska on January 28, 1831, in a prominent peasant family. He finished primary school in Podgora, after which he attended minor seminary in Split where he finished gymnasium. He studied theology at the Major seminary in Zadar from which he graduated in 1854. During his time in seminary, Pavlinović began to take interest in the Illyrian movement. He and his friend Luka Botić (who later also become a prominent writer and politician) founded students' society Pobratimi. Pavlinović was ordained to the priesthood on September 23, 1854, in the ceremony in Split Cathedral.

Career
After ordination, Pavlinović shortly served as vicar in Drašnice. From 1855 to 1870, a time period during which he was entirely dedicated to political and literary work, he was officially vicar in Podgora. While traveling true his homeland, he had a chance to see all the difficulties that Croatian people had, such as the fact that all administration offices, municipalities, and schools were run by foreigners.

Political activities
Pavlinović entered politics after the failure of Bach's absolutism (1850-1859), which is known in Croatia as a period of centralization and Germanization. In August 1860, he became the first prominent Croat in Dalmatia who publicly spoke about the unification of Kingdom of Dalmatia and Kingdom of Croatia-Slavonia. In 1861, Pavlinović, among others, founded People's Party as a Dalmatian branch of the People's Party in Kingdom of Croatia-Slavonia, and as opposition to anti-Croatian Autonomist Party. Having acquired a wide favor, Pavlinović was elected as a member of Diet of Dalmatia on 1861 elections. As a member of Parliament he held a speech in Croatian which sparked protests. It was later decided because of this that MPs could also speak Croatian, which was a great success of People Party considering the immeasurably greater number of Autonomist Party MP's. On March 1, 1862, Pavlinović and his associates started publishing newspaper Narodni list as a Croatian-language part of the Italian-language newspaper Il Nazionale, periodico politico e letterario. Pavlinović was publishing articles intended to awake national consciousness of the Croatian people in Dalmatia. He was also writing for many other newspapers and magazines including Glasnik dalmatinski, Iskra, La Dalmazia cattolica, Narodni koledar, Obzor, Pozor, Vijenac, and Zatočnik. On 1865 Croatian parliamentary election, Pavlinović was elected to the Parliament. On 1873 Cisleithanian legislative election he was elected to the Imperial Council. During his term, he came into conflict with Serbian politician Stjepan Mitrov Ljubiša because of Ljubiša's anti-Croatian stands. He was speaking Croatian in both, Croatian, and Imperial Parliament. Pavlinović's long-term struggle for Croatian resulted in the introduction of Croatian as an official language in all Dalmatian state offices in year 1883.

Ethnicity
In his youth, after the fall of the Illyrian movement in the early 1850s, Pavlinović accepted Serbian national consciousness, thrilled with Serbia who was at the time fighting against Ottoman Empire for liberation and unification in Revolution. He and many other seminarians from Zadar seminary, including Natko Nodilo and Luka Botić, were so impressed with Serbia that they wanted to move there, believing they would be able to develop their capabilities there and thus be of the greatest benefit to Croats. Pavlinović and his friend Jovan Sundečić embarked in 1864 on a tour to South Slavic (soon to be called Yugoslav) cities with the aim of creating a fraternal union. For a period of time, he was an editor of the Montenegrin yearbook Orlić. However, after Luka Botić visited Serbia in 1868, he returned to Croatia very disappointed with what he saw there. This led to Pavlinović and his friends abandoning the idea of Serbia being a "South Slavic Piedmont", and accepting that Croatia and Serbia should stay separated.

Pavlinović defined the program of the People's Party in Dalmatia, that was published in 1869, as a program that should be implemented in the whole of Croatia, and not only in Dalmatia. Program consisted of principles of independence and integrity of Croatia and the adoption of Croatian constitution. While People's Party in the Kingdom of Croatia-Slavonia still had an indefinite transnational name so they would not resent the Serbs because of their shared ideas, Pavlinović thought that "Serbs want to take homeland from Croats", so he used only attributes "Croatian" rather than "Yugoslav" or "Illyrian" in the program.

List of works
Pavlinović's literary work followed his basic political ideas, so he used his works to rise national awareness of Croats in Dalmatia.

 1865 Ognjišar 
 1867 Districts and management of parishes (Kotari i župnikovanje)
 1873 Songs and sermons 1860-1872 (Pjesme i besjede 1860-1872)
 1875 Croatian thoughts (Hrvatski razmišljaji)
 1875 Various writings (Različiti spisi)
 1876 Croatian conversations (Hrvatski razgovori)
 1876 Folk writings (Pučki spisi)
 1879 People's songbook (Narodna pjesmarica)
 1882 Croatian and Serbian thought in Dalmatia from 1848 to 1882  (Misao hrvatska i misao srbska u Dalmaciji od godine 1848. do godine 1882.)
 1888 Paths 1867-1875 (Puti 1867-1875)

In addition, Pavlinović donated to Matica hrvatska 211 proverbs from Istria and Littoral, as well as 4000-5000 words to the Croatian Academy of Sciences and Arts for its Dictionary.

References

External links
 

1831 births
1887 deaths
People from Podgora, Split-Dalmatia County
People from the Kingdom of Dalmatia
19th-century Croatian Roman Catholic priests
People's Party (Dalmatia) politicians
Members of the Austrian House of Deputies (1873–1879)
Members of the Austrian House of Deputies (1885–1891)